Turkey River is an unincorporated community in Clayton County, Iowa, United States. The community of Turkey River borders the Mississippi River, and the Turkey River. Turkey River also is situated on Iowa's border with Wisconsin.

History
Turkey River's population was 53 in 1902, and 77 in 1925.

References

Unincorporated communities in Clayton County, Iowa
Unincorporated communities in Iowa